Barsilene is a genus of erebid moths, first described by Volynkin & Huang in 2019.

Species 

 Barsilene melaninflexa (Černý, 2016)
 Barsilene pallinflexa (Holloway, 2001)

References 

Moth genera
Nudariina
Moths described in 2019